Needful Things is a 1993 American horror film based on Stephen King's 1991 novel of the same name. The film was directed by Fraser C. Heston (Charlton Heston's son; this is his only film without his father in the cast), and stars Ed Harris, Max von Sydow, Bonnie Bedelia, and J. T. Walsh.

Plot

A mysterious proprietor named Leland Gaunt, claiming to be from Akron, Ohio, arrives in the small town of Castle Rock, Maine in a sinister-looking black car and opens a new antique store called "Needful Things". The store sells various items of great personal worth to the residents (some of which, like a pendant that eases pain or a toy which predicts the outcome of horse races, are clearly supernatural). Gaunt demands payment both in cash and in small "favors", usually pranks played by his customers on their neighbors. Gaunt's first customer is a boy named Brian Rusk who buys a rare baseball card featuring Mickey Mantle in exchange for 95 cents and a prank on his neighbor Wilma Wadlowski Jerzyck.

Gaunt makes an impression on the town's people, on whom he pulls pranks. One victim of a prank is a corrupt boat salesman and gambler named Danforth Keeton who embezzled $20,000 of the town people's tax money to pay off his gambling debts. Keeton finds out from Sheriff Alan Pangborn that people are on to him and in turn, he relays his fears to Gaunt and his hatred of those who refer to him as 'Buster' Keeton. To help Keeton with his problems, Gaunt sells him a toy race-horse that predicts the outcome of any horse race from which he might recoup the $20,000 and replace the money before the townsfolk find out officially. Gaunt sells Frank Jewett a first edition of Treasure Island by Robert Louis Stevenson. He also learns of the rivalry between the Catholic priest, Father Meehan and Baptist minister, Reverend Willie Rose when he sells to both of them objects from his shop.

The first hint of Gaunt's true nature is when he has Brian throw muck from the turkey farm onto the newly laundered crisp white sheets hanging on the washing-lines at the house of Wilma Jerzyck. On returning home, Wilma assumes the devastation was caused by her long-time enemy Nettie Cobb. She goes and loudly accuses her of this at Nettie's workplace, the Castle Rock diner. Brian Rusk meets Gaunt at the Lighthouse where he informs Brian he has not fully repaid his debt and expects payment in full right away. Brian returns to Wilma Jerzyck's house and throws apples at her house to smash all the windows. Nettie Cobb has 'bought' a Hummel figurine from Gaunt that is identical to one her violent ex-husband had smashed in a fit of rage. In return she goes to Dan Keeton's house and places citation notices, allegedly from Deputy Sheriff Norris Ridgewick, all around the interior, accusing him of all his misdemeanors. In the meantime, Gaunt has Hugh Priest kill Nettie's dog, in return for a 1950s jacket like he wore at college. This sparks a violent fight between Nettie and Wilma, which gets them both killed.

Gaunt takes a personal measure towards Alan by giving a necklace to his fiancée Polly Chalmers that cures her crippling arthritis. Gaunt tells Polly for it to work she must never take it off. Keeton is found by Gaunt cowering in his shop with a gun. He tells Gaunt that he is thinking of killing Norris Ridgewick to stop him telling everyone about his misdemeanors. Gaunt talks him out of it and takes the gun from him. Brian witnesses the investigation at Wilma Jerzyk's house and hears the sheriff musing over where all the apples came from. Brian is shocked that his actions might in some way have caused this tragedy and tries to talk to Alan about what Gaunt had him do, but is too scared to do so. Alan later approaches Brian when he's alone at the lighthouse and asks what's got him so scared. Brian explains that Gaunt is a monster, before trying to shoot himself in the head. The gun goes off but the sheriff manages to save the boy and Brian is hospitalized. Meanwhile, Alan begins to suspect that Gaunt may not be what he seems.

Father Meehan slashes the tires on Hugh Priest's truck. Hugh Priest sees what has happened to his truck when he is thrown out of the bar for being too drunk. Alan returns from meeting with Brian and is now very suspicious of Gaunt. He tries to warn Polly and asks her to get rid of the necklace, but she is unwilling to remove it. After Alan has gone she tries prying the necklace open to see what is inside and gets an electric shock which throws the necklace across the room. Polly is immediately crippled by her arthritis and cannot reach to pick up the necklace. Gaunt appears in her bedroom and replaces the necklace on Polly's neck. He states the price for necklace will be $20 and a small prank. Polly is so grateful, she pays him immediately and is clearly mesmerized by Gaunt who then seduces her. After which he states that Alan is corrupt and has been embezzling money from the town with Keeton for years. Gaunt convinces Polly to go to Alan's yacht to look for the money. She does and sees much money strewn over her fiancé's desk. Polly phones Alan from the yacht, accuses him of the crime, and in disgust calls off the engagement.

Keeton becomes afraid that everyone including his wife Myrtle is out to get him, and Gaunt convinces him that he is his only ally. Gaunt also has Keeton attack deputy Norris Ridgewick at the police station. Alan manages to subdue Keeton by handcuffing Keeton to his car. Shortly after this, Keeton manages to escape Ridgewick by kicking him in the groin. He then drives home where he accuses his wife of having an affair with Norris and kills her with a hammer. The phone rings and it is Gaunt. He tells Keeton to come to see him, as he has something for him that will make him feel better. Hugh Priest goes into the bar with a shotgun and straight up to the owner, who also pulls out a shotgun from behind the bar and they shoot each other. Gaunt's pranks spread throughout the town and its citizens. Mistaken suspicion, paranoia and anger spread with it. Gaunt starts selling his customers guns, encouraging them to kill whoever wronged them, playing on their greed and fear. Gaunt has Keeton place explosives in the town's Catholic church, where Alan is inside talking to Father Meehan relaying his new suspicions that Gaunt is the Devil incarnate, but Meehan refuses to believe him. The church explodes, but Alan and Meehan manage to escape with their lives. Father Meehan believes that Reverend Willy Rose is behind the attack on the Church and leaves to fight him.

A riot sparks throughout the town, with Gaunt watching from the sidelines. Alan tries desperately to restore order. He pulls his gun on Father Meehan who is trying to behead Reverend Rose and Gaunt encourages him to shoot them. Alan fires into the air, much to Gaunt's disappointment. Getting everyone's attention, Alan convinces the townsfolk of Castle Rock to come to their senses, exposing Gaunt's true nature and his web of lies and manipulation. Everyone stops fighting and admits their pranks, but Keeton, who is despondent, walks up to Alan and Ridgewick, pointing a gun at them with a bomb strapped to himself, threatening to blow everyone up. He is talked down by Alan and turns him against Gaunt. Keeton walks up to Gaunt, who taunts him about his inadequacies and is heard to repeatedly refer to him as 'Buster'. Infuriated, Keeton tackles Gaunt through the store window, setting off the bomb and destroying Needful Things.

Defeated but completely unharmed, Gaunt emerges from the burning wreckage of his store saying that this wasn't his best work. Gaunt walks up to Alan and Polly, telling them they make a cute couple, and he will encounter their grandson in 2053—then departs, presumably to continue his vicious evil work elsewhere, leaving in the same black car in which he arrived.

Cast
 Max von Sydow as Leland Gaunt
 Ed Harris as Sheriff Alan J. Pangborn
 Bonnie Bedelia as Polly Chalmers
 Amanda Plummer as Netitia "Nettie" Cobb
 J. T. Walsh as Danforth "Buster" Keeton III
 Ray McKinnon as Deputy Norris Ridgewick
 Valri Bromfield as Wilma Wadlowski Jerzyck
 Duncan Fraser as Hugh Priest
 Shane Meier as Brian Rusk
 W. Morgan Sheppard as Father Meehan
 Don S. Davis as Reverend Willie Rose
 Gillian Barber as Myrtle Keeton
 Lochlyn Munro as John LaPointe
 Campbell Lane as Frank Jewett
 Frank C. Turner as Pete Jerzyck

Reception
Needful Things received generally negative reviews from critics. The film holds a 31% rating on Rotten Tomatoes, based on 26 reviews, with an average rating of 4.1/10. Audiences polled by CinemaScore gave the film an average grade of "B−" on an A+ to F scale.

Roger Ebert gave it 1.5 out of 4 stars, saying the film "only has one note, which it plays over and over, sort of a Satanic water torture. It's not funny and it's not scary and it's all sort of depressing." Janet Maslin, film and literary critic for The New York Times, gave the film a resoundingly negative review, saying that "though this is by no means the grisliest or most witless film made from one of Mr. King's horrific fantasies, it can lay claim to being the most unpleasant."

Awards
At the 1993 Academy of Science Fiction, Fantasy & Horror Films Awards, Needful Things was nominated for three Saturn Awards and won one: Amanda Plummer for best supporting actress.

Release
On May 22, 1996, Needful Things was aired in a four-hour timeslot on TBS. This airing included an hour of excised footage not included in the theatrical release. Upon release to home media, the film was cut by one hour to two hours in length. The TBS version has a large number of differences to the home release version, including scene extensions, abridgements, different scene arrangements, and more of the town's citizens and their lives.

Home media
Needful Things was released on DVD December 22, 1998, and re-issued on August 27, 2002, and on Blu-ray June 23, 2015.  Special features include the original trailer using footage from the 3-hour cut.

On January 16, 2020, Koch Media released a three-disc Region B/2 Blu-ray/DVD set, with both formats including both the theatrical version and a standard definition open matte version of the TBS extended cut.

References

External links

 
 
 
 

1993 directorial debut films
1990s English-language films
1990s American films
1993 films
1990s crime films
1993 horror films
American crime drama films
American supernatural horror films
Castle Rock Entertainment films
Columbia Pictures films
Films based on works by Stephen King
Films directed by Fraser Clarke Heston
Films set in Maine
New Line Cinema films
Films with screenplays by W. D. Richter
Films based on American horror novels
Films scored by Patrick Doyle